This is a list of transistorized computers, which were digital computers that used discrete transistors as their primary logic elements. Discrete transistors were a feature of logic design for computers from about 1960, when reliable transistors became economically available, until monolithic integrated circuits displaced them in the 1970s. The list is organized by operational date or delivery year to customers. Computers announced, but never completed, are not included. Some very early "transistor" computers may still have included vacuum tubes in the power supply or for auxiliary functions.

1950s

1953
University of Manchester Transistor Computer 1953 (prototype) 1955 (full scale) experimental

1954
Bell Labs TRADIC  for U.S. Air Force

1955
Harwell CADET demonstrated February 1955, one-off scientific computer

1956
Electrotechnical Laboratory ETL Mark III (Japan)  experimental, began development 1954, completed 1956, Japan's first transistorized stored-program computer
MIT TX-0
Metrovick 950

1957
Burroughs SM-65 Atlas ICBM Guidance Computer MOD1, AN/GSQ-33 (no relation to Manchester ATLAS)
Ramo-Wooldridge (TRW) RW-30 airborne computer
Univac TRANSTEC,  for US Navy
Univac ATHENA, US Air Force missile guidance (ground control)
IBM 608 transistor calculator (its development was preceded by the prototyping of an experimental all-transistor version of the 604 demonstrated in October 1954), announced 1955, first shipped December 1957
DRTE Computer, Canadian experimental system delivered 1957, added parallel math unit and other improvements in 1960.

1958

Electrologica X1
TX-2
UNIVAC Solid State ("mostly" solid state)
Philco Transac S-1000 scientific computer- Navy/NSA SOLO,  one-off for NSA
Philco Transac S-2000 electronic data processing computer
Mailüfterl 
RCA 501 intended as a commercial system but used in military applications
Siemens System 2002 – Prototype in operation since 1956, first machine was put in operation in 1958.
Autonetics Recomp II

1959

NCR 304, announced in 1957, first delivery in 1959
Olivetti Elea 9003
MOBIDIC
IBM 7090 (6/60)
IBM 1401
IBM 1620 Model I and successors IBM 1620 Model II
NEAC 2201 (NEC)
EMIDEC 1100
TRW RW-300
PDP-1
Standard Elektrik Lorenz SEL ER 56

1960s

1960
AEI 1010
Honeywell 200 
Honeywell 800 first installation 1960 
UNIVAC LARC
CDC 160 (7/60)
CDC 1604 (1/60)
Datasaab D2
DRTE Computer, expanded version
Elliott 803
GE  210
AN/FSQ-32 (IBM 4020)
AN/FSQ-31V
IBM 7070 (6/60)
Japan Electrotechnical Laboratory ETL Mark V (5/60)
Mitsubishi MELCOM 3409
Clary DE-60
Monroe Calculating Machine Mark XI (or "Monrobot XI")
Packard Bell Corporation PB 250 (PB250; no relation to the modern brand of personal computers) used, among others, as the controller for hybrid digital/analog system TRICE and HYCOMP 250, and as the control computer for mobile data systems
Philco TRANSAC S-2000 Model 211
RCA 301

1961

Plessey XL4 
MANIAC III
CAB500
LEO III
English Electric KDP10
Bendix G-20
NEC NEAC 2205
CDC 160A (7/61)
CDC 924, 
CDC 924A (8/61)
Fujitsu FACOM 222
GE-200 series
GE-225 1961
GE-215 1963
GE-205,235 1964
GE Datanet 30
Honeywell 400 (12/61)
IBM 1410
IBM 7030 Stretch
IBM 7074 (12/51)
Zuse Z23
IBM 7080 (9/61)
IBM 1710
Matsushita MADIC IIA
RCA 301 (2/61)
TRW-130 aka AN/UYK-1 for Transit submarine navigation satellite receivers
UNIVAC 490
Regnecentralen GIER

1962

Philco TRANSAC S-2000 Model 212
Atlas Computer (Manchester)
ASC-15
Burroughs D825
CDC 1604-A
DEC PDP-4
GE  412 (7/62)
ICT 1301
ILLIAC II
UNIVAC 1004  
UNIVAC 1107
UNIVAC III

IBM 7072 (6/62)
IBM 7094 (9/62)
Autonetics D-17B
Royal Radar Establishment Automatic Computer
Telefunken TR4
RW-400 aka AN/FSQ-27 by TRW
SDS 910
SDS 920
Odra 1002
Ferranti Argus – first delivery in 1962, renamed to Argus 200 in 1963
Librascope L-2010

1963

Librascope LGP-21
IBM 1440
IBM 7010
IBM 7040 and IBM 7044
CDC 3000 series, 5 models (1963-1967)
DEC PDP-5
Elliott 503 
Ferranti-Packard 6000
Ferranti Argus 100
Honeywell 1400 (12/63) 
Honeywell 1800  (11/63)
Computer Control Company DDP-24 (6/63)
RCA 601 
UNIVAC 418
UNIVAC 1050 III*UNIVAC 1050 III (9/63)
SDS 9300
BESM 3M, 4 circa 1963 
Siemens 3003
IBM Saturn Launch Vehicle Computer (hybrid, August 1963)

1964

Burroughs B5500
CDC 1604B
DEC PDP-7
DEC PDP-8
IBM 7094 II (4/64)
GE 235 (4/64) 
GE-400 series
GE 415 (5/64)
GE 425 (6/64)
English Electric KDF8
English Electric KDF9
Honeywell 200/200 (7/64)
Honeywell 200/2200 (12/65)
RCA 3301 (7/64)
SDS 925
SDS 930
UNIVAC 1004 II, III (6/64)
CDC 160G (4/64)
CDC 6600
Titan (1963 computer) (Atlas 2)
Bunker-Ramo BR-133 aka AN/UYK-3
UMC-10
PDP-6

1965

ICT 1900 series
CDC 1604-C
GE 435 (9/65)
GE-600 series  (some integrated circuits)
NCR 315-RMC
PDP-8 & 8S (1965 & 1966) 
IBM System/360 family, 14 models (1965-1971). Used IBM SLT hybrid circuits.
IBM 1130 IBM's least-expensive computer at that time, also used hybrid circuits (IBM SLT)
IBM M44/44X 
SDS 940
TRASK, transistor version of BESK
Model 109-B
Ural computer family, 3 models (1965-1969)
Fabri-Tek BI-TRAN SIX Computer Educational System
 Computer Control DDP-116 & 124
Marconi Myriad I, Ferranti Minicor I hybrid diode–transistor logic
UNIVAC 1108 II (9/65)

1966

CDC 6400 (June 1966)
DEC PDP-8/S
DEC PDP-9
GE 115 (4/66)
Honeywell 200/120 (2/66)
Honeywell 200/1200 (1/66)
Honeywell 200/4200 (12/66)
IBM 1800
SDS 940
SDS Sigma 2
UNIVAC 494
UNIVAC 1005 I, II, III (2/66)

1967
CER-22
D4a built in 1963 by Joachim Lehmann at the TU Dresden in about 10 exemplars. After modifications produced from 1967 as Cellatron 8201.
Honeywell 200/8200

1968
PDP-10 (first model only – later versions used ICs)
SDS 945
BESM-6 (first model only – later versions used ICs)
Moscow Power Engineering Institute M-54
Digico Micro 16

1969
CDC 6700
CDC 7600
GE 105
GE-615
UNIVAC 1106
Univac	400
PDP-12

See also
List of vacuum tube computers

Notes

References

Transistorized computers